Squalidus nitens is a species of cyprinid fish endemic to the Yangtze in China.

References

Squalidus
Fish described in 1873
Taxa named by Albert Günther